Michael Wawuyo Sr is a Ugandan actor and special effects artist. He is notable for his big screen roles on Last King of Scotland, Kony: Order from Above, The Only Son, Sometimes in April, The Mercy of the Jungle and small screen roles on NTV's Yat Madit and Power of Legacy.

Career
Wawuyo broke into the film scene when he played a terrorist soldier in a 1991 Mira Nair directed film Mississippi Masala. He went on to play mostly soldier roles such as an intelligence security officer in Black Blood, a military commander in a 2005 history-period HBO TV Movie  film Sometimes in April about the Rwandan genocide of 1994 and an air force commander in The Last King of Scotland, a 2016 Hollywood film about the former Ugandan president Idi Amin. He has also acted in many local and regional films like The Mercy of the Jungle, Situka, Kony: Order from Above, The Only Son and The Boda Boda Thieves (Abaabi Ba Booda).
He debuted his television role as Achan, on NTV's Yat Madit in 2016. He then played Mr. Batte, the patriarch of the Batte family and the CEO of the family business in a 2019 television series Power of Legacy. 
He also did work as a special effects and make up artist on films that include The Felista's Fable, for which he received his first nomination at the 2nd Africa Magic Viewers' Choice Awards in 2014, The Mercy of the Jungle in 2018 and Imbabazi: The Pardon of 2013.

Filmography

Awards and nominations

References

External links

 

Living people
Ugandan male actors
1948 births